The Swedish rock band The Hives has released one demo album, four extended plays, five studio albums, one compilation album and one live album.

Albums

Studio albums

Live albums
Live at Third Man Records (2020)

Compilation albums

EPs
Sounds Like Sushi (demo) (1994)
Oh Lord! When? How? (1996)
A.K.A. I-D-I-O-T (1998)
A Killer Among Us (along with The Pricks) (1998)
Tarred and Feathered (2010)

Singles

Notes

Music videos
 "A.K.A. I-D-I-O-T" (1998)
 "Hate to Say I Told You So" (2000)
 "Main Offender" (2001)
 "Die, All Right!" (2001)
 "Walk Idiot Walk" (2004)
 "Two-Timing Touch and Broken Bones" (2004)
 "Abra Cadaver" (2004)
 "A Little More for Little You" (2004)
 "Throw It on Me" (with Timbaland) (2007)
 "Tick Tick Boom" (2007)
 "Won't Be Long" (2008)
 "Go Right Ahead" (2012)
 "Wait a Minute" (2012)

DVDs
Tussles in Brussels (2004)

References

Discography
Discographies of Swedish artists
Rock music group discographies